Eyzaguirre is a surname of Basque origin. Spelling variants include Eizaguirre, attested specially in Spain, or Eizagirre, modern Basque spelling. Other historically attested forms (as cited by Luis Michelena) are "Aizaguirre" (Gipuzkoa, 1782), "Aiçaguer", "Aizagerri" (placename in Pamplona, 1574). 

Many Eizag(u)irre surnames come from the coastal area of Getaria and Zarautz, in the province of Gipuzkoa (Spain), where it is popular nowadays. It probably means 'place exposed to wind': (h)aize ('wind') + agirre ('exposed place, hill').

It may refer to:

Agustín Eyzaguirre, Provisional President of Chile (1826–1827)
Domingo Eyzaguirre, Chilean politician and philanthropist
Francisca Eyzaguirre, Chilean actress
Ignacio Eizaguirre, Basque footballer
Jaime Eyzaguirre, Chilean historian
Luis Eyzaguirre, Chilean soccer player
Nicolás Eyzaguirre, Chilean Minister of Finance (2000–2006)
Sebastián Eyzaguirre, Chilean journalist
Xabier Eizagirre, Basque footballer
Delfín Eyzaguirre Sanjinés, Renown Bolivian Lawyer (1889-1963)
Fermín Eyzaguirre, Bolivian Signee of the Declaration of Independence of Bolivia

Basque-language surnames